The Sound of Country Music is a studio album by American country music artist Dottie West and her band, "The Heartaches". It was released in February 1967 on RCA Camden Records. The sessions were co-produced by Chet Atkins and Ethel Gabriel. The project was West's fifth studio effort and first for the RCA Camden label. The album did not produce any singles nor reach peak positions on national charts. It was instead a collection of cover songs previously recorded by others.

Background, content and release
The Sound of Country Music was part of a series of albums released by the RCA Camden label to promote country artists already signed to RCA Victor. West had been signed to the latter label since 1963 and had issued four albums since then. The sessions for the album took place in November 1966 at the RCA Studio in Nashville, Tennessee. The recording sessions were co-produced by Chet Atkins and Ethel Gabriel. It was West's first experience working with Gabriel as she had previously been under the supervision of Atkins.

The album consisted of ten tracks. RCA Camden was a considered a budget record label, which meant it would include previously-released material. However, The Sound of Country Music consisted of entirely new recordings, all of which were cover versions of songs. Among the tracks West covered was "You Ain't Woman Enough" by Loretta Lynn, "Together Again" by Buck Owens and "Crazy Arms" by Ray Price.

The Sound of Country Music was released in February 1967 on RCA Camden, becoming her fifth studio recording. On the record's release, her backing band (The Heartaches) received equal billing. It was issued as a vinyl LP, consisting of five songs on each side of the record. The album did not reach any peak positions on national publication charts, notably Billboard. It also did not spawn any singles to radio.

Track listing

Personnel
All credits are adapted from the liner notes of The Sound of Country Music.

Musical personnel
 Harold Bradley – guitar
 Ray Edenton – guitar
 Buddy Harman – drums
 Roy Huskey – bass
 Tommy Jackson – fiddle
 Grady Martin – guitar
 Hargus "Pig" Robbins – piano
 Dottie West – lead vocals
 Bill West – steel guitar

Technical personnel
 Chet Atkins – producer 
 Ethel Gabriel – producer
 Bill Vandevort – engineering

Release history

References

1967 albums
Albums produced by Chet Atkins
Dottie West albums
RCA Camden albums